Serrate RNA effector molecule homolog (SRRT) also known as arsenite-resistance protein 2 (ARS2) is a protein that in humans is encoded by the SRRT gene.

The SRRT gene product plays a role in RNA-mediated gene silencing (RNAi) by miRNAs. Independently of its activity on miRNAs, it is necessary and sufficient to promote neural stem cell self-renewal, by directly binding to the SOX2 promoter and positively regulating its transcription. It enables the binding activity of the mRNA cap binding complex and the adaptor activity of certain protein molecules. It can be found in the nucleoplasm and is part of the ribonucleoprotein complex. It is involved in cell cycle progression around the S phase.

It does not directly confer arsenite resistance but rather modulates arsenic sensitivity. Diseases associated with SRRT include spondylocostal dysostosis and cerebral arteriopathy.

References

Further reading